James Lewis Brock (December 9, 1917 – May 7, 1989) was an American football player.  He played his entire six-year career with the Green Bay Packers and was inducted into the Green Bay Packers Hall of Fame in 1982.

References

External links 
 

1917 births
1989 deaths
People from Stafford, Kansas
American football defensive backs
American football quarterbacks
American football running backs
Purdue Boilermakers football players
Green Bay Packers players
Players of American football from Kansas